Paphiopedilum subgenus Cochlopetalum is a subgenus of the genus Paphiopedilum.

Distribution
Plants from this section are found in South East Asia in Indonesia and Malaysia.

Species
Paphiopedilum subgenus Cochlopetalum comprises the following species:

References

Orchid subgenera